German Tyrol is a historical region in the Alps now divided between Austria and Italy.  It includes largely ethnic German areas of historical County of Tyrol: the Austrian state of Tyrol (consisting of North Tyrol and East Tyrol) and the province of South Tyrol but not the largely Italian-speaking province of Trentino (formerly Welschtirol).

History

German Tyrol was historically an integral part of the Habsburg constituent Princely County of Tyrol but, with the imminent collapse of Habsburg Austria-Hungary at the end of World War I, areas of the empire with an ethnic German majority began to take actions to form a new state.

On 11 November 1918, Emperor Charles I of Austria relinquished power and, on 12 November, these ethnic German areas, including the Province of German Tyrol (German: Provinz Deutschtirol) were declared the Republic of German Austria with the intent of unifying with Germany.  However, South Tyrol had been promised as spoils of war to Italy by the Entente powers in the Treaty of London. The remainder of German Tyrol became the Austrian federal state of Tyrol.

See also
German Austria
History of Tyrol
Euroregion Tyrol-South Tyrol-Trentino

Tyrol (region)
Historical regions in Austria
Establishments in the Republic of German-Austria
States and territories established in 1918
1918 establishments in Europe